Tsvetomir Todorov (born 31 March 1991) is a Bulgarian footballer who plays as a forward for Bulgarian Third league club Bdin Vidin. He played in the Bulgarian top division for Minyor Pernik and Slavia Sofia.

References

External links
 
 
 

1991 births
Living people
Bulgarian footballers
First Professional Football League (Bulgaria) players
Association football forwards
OFC Bdin Vidin players
PFC Minyor Pernik players
PFC Slavia Sofia players
PFC Spartak Pleven players
SFC Etar Veliko Tarnovo players
FC Kariana Erden players
FC Strumska Slava Radomir players
FC CSKA 1948 Sofia players
FC Sozopol players
People from Vidin